Mark Levin (born August 20, 1968) is an American film director and screenwriter. He has been a screenwriter, producer, and director in both television and film for over twenty years. He is mostly known for directing the films Little Manhattan and Nim's Island. He is married to his collaborator, the screenwriter and director Jennifer Flackett.  They are the creators of The Man's Guide To Love, which began as a successful video blog offering man to man advice on the subject of love. The Man's Guide To Love book will be published by Simon & Schuster, and a feature film they are directing and producing alongside Laurence Mark.

Career
During the 1990s, he was a writer and producer for the television series The Wonder Years, Missing Persons (produced by Stephen J. Cannell) and Earth 2, a series he co-created and executive produced. As a screenwriter, he and Flackett also wrote the films Madeline, Wimbledon and Journey to the Center of the Earth.

In 2016 he co-created the animated sitcom Big Mouth.  The series stars Nick Kroll and John Mulaney and is being produced for Netflix.

Personal life
Levin grew up in Detroit, the son of Donald Marvin Levin. He has one sister and one brother. Levin, his wife and two children live in New York City and Los Angeles. In 2012, Levin & Flackett undertook a one-year journey around-the-world with their two children. Dubbed “A Year To Think,” they visited 38 countries and 110 cities across six continents over 365 days, during which they made 120 short films about their experiences.

Filmography

References

External links
 
 

1966 births
American male screenwriters
American television producers
American television writers
Living people
Skydance Media people
Writers from Detroit
Film directors from Michigan
American male television writers
Screenwriters from Michigan
Jewish American screenwriters
20th-century American screenwriters
20th-century American male writers
21st-century American screenwriters
21st-century American male writers
21st-century American Jews